Kamil Kuzma (born 8 March 1988) is a Slovak footballer who plays for MŠK Tesla Stropkov as a midfielder.

Club career
He was signed by Spartak Trnava in July 2013 and made his debut for them against Trenčín on 21 July 2013.

Honours
Košice

 Slovak Cup: 2009

References

External links
 MFK Košice profile
 

1988 births
Living people
People from Stropkov
Sportspeople from the Prešov Region
Association football midfielders
Slovak footballers
FC VSS Košice players
ŠK Senec players
FC Spartak Trnava players
FK Železiarne Podbrezová players
Slovak Super Liga players